"Just You and I" is a song recorded by Japanese singer Namie Amuro, taken from her sixth compilation album Finally. It was released on May 31, 2017 by Dimension Point and Avex Trax. The song was served as the theme song to the Japanese television series To Be a Mother.

"Just You and I" peaked at number two on the Billboard Japan Hot 100. It has sold over 34,596 physical copies and 100,000 download copies and been certificated gold by Recording Industry Association of Japan (RIAJ). Also, its B-side track "Strike a Pose" peaked at number 57 on the chart.

Commercial performance
Commercially, "Just You and I" was a moderate success in Japan. It debuted at number two on the Japan Hot 100 and debuted at number six on the Oricon Weekly Singles Chart, selling 23,103 physical copies in its first week. It has been certificated gold by Recording Industry Association of Japan (RIAJ) with 100,000 download copies sold.

Track listing and formats

Charts

"Just You and I"

Weekly charts

"Strike a Pose"

Weekly charts

Sales and certification

Release history

References

2017 songs
2017 singles
Avex Trax singles
Namie Amuro songs